Goffriller is a surname. Notable people with the surname include:

Francesco Goffriller (1692–1750), Italian violin, viola and cello maker 
Matteo Goffriller (1659–1742), Venetian luthier